Rodney van Buizen (born 25 September 1980) is an Australian former professional baseball player.

Career
In 2004, he was part of the Australian Olympic baseball team, who achieved a silver medal in the baseball tournament at the Athens Olympics.  He was equal third in the competition for runs batted in. Van Buizen continues to participate in baseball as a player with the Manly Eagles in the Sydney Major League.

References

External links

1980 births
Living people
Australian expatriate baseball players in the United States
Australian people of Dutch descent
Baseball infielders
Baseball players at the 2000 Summer Olympics
Baseball players at the 2004 Summer Olympics
Great Falls Dodgers players
Jacksonville Suns players
Medalists at the 2004 Summer Olympics
Olympic baseball players of Australia
Olympic medalists in baseball
Olympic silver medalists for Australia
Baseball players from Sydney
Vero Beach Dodgers players
Wilmington Waves players
Yakima Bears players
2006 World Baseball Classic players